Ethel Minnie Lackie (February 10, 1907 – December 15, 1979), also known by her married name Ethel Watkins, was an American competition swimmer, Olympic champion, and world record-holder.

Lackie represented the United States at the 1924 Summer Olympics in Paris.  Individually, she won a gold medal in the women's 100-meter freestyle, finishing with a time of 1:12.4, and leading an American medal sweep of the event.  She also won a second gold medal as a member of the first-place U.S. team in the women's 4×100-meter freestyle relay, together with American teammates Euphrasia Donnelly, Gertrude Ederle and Mariechen Wehselau.  The U.S. relay team set a new world record of 4:58.8 in the event final. In 1969 she was inducted into the International Swimming Hall of Fame.

She was born in Chicago, Illinois and attended high school at University High in the Hyde Park community of Chicago. After retiring from competitions she married Bill Watkins, a rower from the Santa Monica area. She died in Newbury Park, California.

See also
 List of members of the International Swimming Hall of Fame
 List of Olympic medalists in swimming (women)
 World record progression 100 metres freestyle
 World record progression 4 × 100 metres freestyle relay

References

1907 births
1979 deaths
American female freestyle swimmers
World record setters in swimming
Medalists at the 1924 Summer Olympics
Olympic gold medalists for the United States in swimming
Swimmers from Chicago
Swimmers at the 1924 Summer Olympics
20th-century American women
20th-century American people